Johann Heinrich Burchard (26 July 1852 – 6 September 1912) was a Hamburg lawyer and politician who served as senator (from 1885 until his death) and First Mayor and President of the Senate of the Free and Hanseatic City of Hamburg (in 1903, 1906, 1908–1909 and from 1 January 1912 until his death).

Burchard was born in Bremen, a member of the Hanseatic Burchard family, the son of banker Friedrich Wilhelm Burchard (1824–92) and Marianne Gossler (1830–1908), a granddaughter of Senator and banker Johann Heinrich Gossler and a great-granddaughter of Johann Hinrich Gossler and Elisabeth Berenberg. His father was a merchant in Bremen, who in 1853 became a partner of the Berenberg Bank (Joh. Berenberg, Gossler & Co.) owned by his wife's family. The family then relocated to Hamburg, where, after taking part in the Franco-Prussian War as a volunteer, he completed his abitur at the Gelehrtenschule des Johanneums before studying law at the Universities of Leipzig, Heidelberg and Göttingen.

As a typical Hanseat, he rejected noble titles and any form of awards.

A portrait of Burchard by Max Liebermann is displayed at Hamburg's representation (embassy) in Berlin.

In 1877, he married Emily Henriette Amsinck (1858–1931), a daughter of Wilhelm Amsinck (1821–1909). His oldest son, Wilhelm Amsinck Burchard-Motz, was also a Hamburg senator and Second Mayor.

Heinrich Burchard died in Hamburg, aged 60.

References

External links
 

Leipzig University alumni
Heidelberg University alumni
University of Göttingen alumni
People educated at the Gelehrtenschule des Johanneums
Mayors of Hamburg
Senators of Hamburg (before 1919)
Grand burghers of Hamburg
1852 births
1912 deaths